The Terrorist Identities Datamart Environment (TIDE) is the U.S. government's central database on known or suspected international terrorists, and contains highly classified information provided by members of the Intelligence Community such as CIA, DIA, FBI, NSA, and many others.

As of February 2017, there are 1.6 million names in TIDE. In 2008, more than 27,000 names were removed from the list when it was determined they no longer met the criteria for inclusion.  According to the FBI, international terrorists include those persons who carry out terrorist activities under foreign direction. For this purpose, they may include U.S. persons (U.S. citizens and legal permanent residents). The Terrorist Identities Group (TIG), located in NCTC's Information Sharing & Knowledge Development Directorate (ISKD), is responsible for building and maintaining TIDE.

From the classified TIDE database, an unclassified, but sensitive, extract is provided to the FBI's Terrorist Screening Center, which compiles the Terrorist Screening Database (TSDB).

This database, in turn, is used to compile various watch lists such as the TSA's No Fly List, State Department's Consular Lookout and Support System, Homeland Security's Interagency Border Inspection System, and FBI's NCIC (National Crime Information Center) for state and local law enforcement.

Tuscan and Tactics

Documents revealed under the Access to Information Act indicate that all border guards and immigration offers have access to a US database of 680,000 people affiliated with terrorism and maintained by the United States. The names on the list come from the US Terrorist Identities Datamart Environment (TIDE), which populates various US traveller databases, Canada's Tuscan and the Australian equivalent, "Tactics".

See also

Computer Assisted Passenger Prescreening System
Datamart
Open Source Information System
No Fly List
Selectee list

References

External links
Terror Database Has Quadrupled In Four Years - washingtonpost.com (March 25, 2007)

Terrorism databases
Government databases in the United States